Kendra Lancaster (born July 2, 1987) is an American Paralympic volleyballist.

Biography
Lancaster was born in Indianapolis, Indiana. She started competing for Paralympic Games in 2004 where she won a bronze medal for her participation at 2004 Paralympic Games in Athens, Greece. In 2008, she participated at 2008 Paralympics where she won a silver medal. In 2011 and 2012 respectively she won 2 more silver medals for Sitting Volleyball World Championships and for 2012 Paralympic Games in London.

References

External links
 
 

1987 births
Living people
Sportspeople from Indianapolis
Paralympic volleyball players of the United States
Paralympic bronze medalists for the United States
Paralympic silver medalists for the United States
Medalists at the 2004 Summer Paralympics
Medalists at the 2008 Summer Paralympics
Medalists at the 2012 Summer Paralympics
Volleyball players at the 2004 Summer Paralympics
Volleyball players at the 2008 Summer Paralympics
Volleyball players at the 2012 Summer Paralympics
American sitting volleyball players
Women's sitting volleyball players
Volleyball players from Indiana
Paralympic medalists in volleyball